NGC 7317 is an elliptical galaxy that is a member of Stephan's Quintet in the constellation Pegasus.  The James Webb Space Telescope photographed it as part of Stephan's Quintet; the image was released on 12 July 2022.

References

 http://seds.org/
 https://webbtelescope.org/contents/news-releases/2022/news-2022-034

External links

Elliptical galaxies
Pegasus (constellation)
7317
69279
Stephan's Quintet